ABC Network may refer to:
American Broadcasting Company, a commercial television network in the United States
Australian Broadcasting Corporation, Australia's public broadcaster
ABC Weekend TV, a former ITV company in the United Kingdom
Asahi Broadcasting Corporation, regional radio and television broadcaster in Japan
 Associated Broadcasting Company
 a former name of TV5 Network, a radio and television network in the Philippines
 a former name of Associated Television (ATV), a former ITV company in the United Kingdom